, also known simply as Chloe, is a fictional character from the Tekken fighting game franchise by Bandai Namco Entertainment, making her debut in Tekken 7. She is a teenage girl wearing a black, pink and white kitten-themed costume, including cat ears, tail, and paws. She is described as an otaku, having an obsession with Japanese pop culture and speaking in Japanese and English with a Japanese accent. She is hired by G Corporation to be a mascot commercial.

Her fighting style involves a lot of kicks, twirls, and flips, somewhat like a hip-hop dancer. As shown in her, Eddy Gordo and Jack-7's own endings, she's a good actress in her idol persona, but is revealed to be mean spirited in real life. Reception for Lucky Chloe has been mixed, with some criticizing her for an "uninspired and generic" design, while other have defended her by claiming that Tekken has had a number of more "ridiculous" characters than her.

Appearances

Tekken series
Lucky Chloe is a J-pop sensation, devotion Otaku and the face of the G Corporation brand. When Eddy Gordo burst into G Corp and took out guard after guard with dance-like techniques, Chloe fearlessly walked right up to him and blocked his path.

She threw the man one of her trademark smiles and issued him a challenge: Fight her, and if he loses he'll have to work as her backup dancer. Without caring if he'd accepted the conditions or not, she prepared for battle, and enters the King of Iron Fist Tournament 7. The tournament veteran, Interpol's detective Lei Wulong happens to be her fan.

Design and gameplay
Chloe was designed by Yūsuke Kozaki, a character designer who had also worked on Fire Emblem Awakening and the No More Heroes series. The character's revelation drew complaints from forums such as NeoGAF, with some going so far as to ask director Katsuhiro Harada to remove the character from the game. Others, meanwhile, called out the character for being a fish out-of water conception or drew comparisons with characters from other fighting game series, Harada tweeted that he would consider to make Chloe exclusive for the Asian and European versions and a make well-muscled skinhead for the North American market; though the tweet was later clarified as a joke, as several game outlets apparently took the comment seriously.

Chloe's fighting style is Freestyle Dance. According to the German edition GamePro, "Chloe kills the life energy of her opponents with her nimble Mids and Lows bit by bit - a comparatively aggressive character, whose fighting style meets her cat costume."

Merchandise
A  scale statue of Lucky Chloe was released in July 2016 by Kotobukiya. The artwork for the statue was designed by Shunya Yamashita.

Reception
Overall reception for Lucky Chloe has been mixed, with Wesley Yin-Poole of Eurogamer observing "Lucky Chloe has already divided the fighting game community, with some criticising her Japanese idol design as uninspired and generic. Others point to the fact the Tekken series, despite being more realistic in terms of hand-to-hand combat, has a tradition of including outlandish characters, many of which are designed to appeal to a Japanese audience." Todd Black from ToonZone asked if Tekken 7 "crossed a line" by including Chloe in the game, where he added "For while fighting games may not be “realistic”, they are meant to be believable. Or at least, believable within the context of the world. If you compare Street Fighter to Tekken, you see clear differences between the fighters and their styles. But even in those worlds, what's believable, and what's not, is clear. Enter...Lucky Chloe..." Black also stated "She wasn't believable in the context of Tekken 7. Whether it was her ridiculous outfit, the fact that her hands are essentially padded (and thus won't have as much striking power as her hands without them), or even her breakdancing fighting style, fans just couldn't put stock into her." At WhatCulture, gaming journalist Scott Tailford declared her as the worst character in Tekken 7, commenting "A character that almost feels designed to annoy the hardcore set, Lucky Chloe's aesthetic is already far too influenced by the most stereotypical of eastern tween anime, but in practice, her moveset just doesn't hold up either." Tailford also criticizes her Rage Art for being "incredibly cheap," due to her "sliding" under other characters before connecting.

Gavin Jasper from Den of Geek sarcastically responded to her criticism by saying "Yes, it seems that a girl dressed as a cat just doesn't fit in with a cast of such characters as a boxing kangaroo, a man made of wood, a robot teenage girl with chainsaw hands, and...whatever the hell Yoshimitsu is." Eddie Makuch of GameSpot was more neutral about her, stating "The Tekken series is known for its quirky characters, so Lucky Chloe's outlandish design isn't much of a surprise." In a list of characters more "ridiculous" than Chloe, Eurogamer's Aoife Wilson spoke in defense of her, noting that she likes "flippy kick-ass fighters", while also praising her "adorable" attitude. In a review of Tekken 7 by Game Revolution, James Kozanitis opined that Chloe "is sure to be a fan favorite," citing her obsession with the Japanese culture.

Despite the more negative criticism she has received in North America, Harada stated in 2020 that Lucky Chloe has been used in Tekken 7 more in North America than any other region.

References

Dancer characters in video games
Female characters in video games
Fictional gymnasts
Fictional dancers
Otaku in fiction
Teenage characters in video games
Tekken characters
Woman soldier and warrior characters in video games
Video game characters introduced in 2015
Catgirls